Loretto School, founded in 1827, is an independent boarding and day school for boys and girls aged 0 to 18. The campus occupies  in Musselburgh, East Lothian, Scotland.

History
The school was founded by the Reverend Thomas Langhorne in 1827. Langhorne came from Crosby Ravensworth in Westmorland. He named the school for Loretto House, his then home, which was itself named for a medieval chapel dedicated to Our Lady of Loreto, which had formerly stood on the site of the school. The school was later taken over by his son, also named Thomas Langhorne. The last link with the Langhorne family was Thomas' son John, who was a master at Loretto from 1890 to 1897, and later headmaster at John Watson's Institution. Loretto was later under the headmastership of Dr. Hely Hutchinson Almond from 1862 to 1903.

In the 1950s the school increased the accommodation in science laboratories, established arts as a part of the curriculum and introduced the chapel service as part of the daily school life.

The school originally accepted only boys, but in 1981 girls joined the sixth form and in 1995 the third form, so making the school fully co-educational by 1995.

In 2001 the film director Don Boyd published an article in The Observer detailing his systematic sexual abuse by a teacher in the school in the 1960s. The revelation led to further allegations about the teacher from other former pupils and subsequent calls for the teacher's prosecution. The teacher, then 79 years old, was charged, but the case was dropped on the grounds of his ill health. The teacher later died. In 2017, it was announced that the school would be investigated as part of Lady Smith's inquiry into child sexual abuse.

In 2021, Boyd told the Scottish Child Abuse Inquiry that the late Guy Ray-Hills, a French teacher at Loretto, raped him in 1958 when Boyd was 10 years old. Loretto School admitted to the Inquiry that pupils had been abused by one of its teachers in the 1950s and 1960s and gave an unreserved apology.

In 2010 the school was sued by an employee for sex discrimination: the employee felt she had been treated unfavourably following the announcement of her pregnancy. Judge Stewart Watt rejected the sexual discrimination claim asserting that 'there appears to be have been no ulterior motive to make [the employee] redundant during the review of the department; the only motive was to try to better organise the school', but he stated that the school had breached maternity regulations.

In 2013, Loretto School was informed by the Scottish Charity Regulator that it did not qualify for charitable status for failing to provide sufficient public benefit. Subsequently, the school modified its means-tested bursary provision and has remained a registered charity ever since.

Former Scotland rugby captain Jason White took his first steps into teaching with a role at the school in September 2017. In the same month it was announced that Jacob Slater, 15, a pupil at the school, would appear in the American-Scottish historical action drama Outlaw King about Robert the Bruce and the Wars of Scottish Independence.

Jamie Parker, former Loretto School pupil and Royal Academy of Dramatic Art student, was named Best Actor at the Olivier Awards in April 2017 for his performance as Harry Potter.

In September 2018, the employment of a teacher at the school, who had been accused of inappropriate behaviour towards students, was terminated.

Loretto School was listed as the fourth-highest Scottish independent school in the 2018 A level league tables.

Facilities
Loretto School is set in an  campus and is made up of three parts: the Nursery for children aged 0–5, the Junior School ("The Nippers") for children aged 5–12, and the Senior School for those aged 12–18. Pupils attend as boarders, flexi-boarders and day pupils and are all attached to a specific house. Houses include Schoolhouse (day pupils), Seton House (boys' boarding), Holm House (girls' boarding), Balcarres House (girls' boarding), Pinkie House (boys' boarding), Hope House (boys' boarding) and Eleanora Almond House. It was announced on 27 June 2018 that Eleanora Almond House would be temporarily closed at the end of the academic year for renovation and extension.

Loretto Golf Academy
The Loretto Golf Academy, established in 2002, offers golf to over 250 pupils using the local links courses and the School's new Indoor Golf Centre.

Headmasters
 1825–1862 Langhorne family (Thomas, Thomas II, John)
 1862–1903 Hely Hutchinson Almond
 1903–1908 Henry Barrington Tristram
 1908–1926 Allan Ramsey Smith
 1926–1945 Dr James Robertson Campbell Greenlees
 1945–1960 David Forbes Mackintosh
 1960–1976 Rab Brougham Bruce Lockhart
 1976–1984 David Bruce McMurray
 1984–1995 The Rev. Norman Walker Drummond
 1995–2000 Keith Joseph Budge
 2001–2008 Michael Barclay Mavor
 2008–2013 Peter A. Hogan 
 2013–2014 Elaine Logan (Acting Head)
 2014 – present Dr Graham Hawley

Notable alumni

Notable Old Lorettonians include:

 Sir A. G. G. Asher – international cricketer and rugby player
 George Bertram Cockburn – pioneer aviator
 William Beardmore – cricketer
 Don Boyd – film director, producer, screenwriter, novelist
 Alexander Bruce, Lord Balfour of Burleigh – Unionist representative peer, Secretary for Scotland, Governor of the Bank of Scotland, Chancellor of the University of St Andrews, and leading figure in the Church of Scotland
A. B. Carmichael - international rugby player 
Charles Walker Cathcart - international rugby player and surgeon
 Iain Conn - CEO Centrica
 Alexander Cary, Master of Falkland – nobleman and screenwriter
 Jim Clark – Formula One Champion (twice), Grand Prix winner and world champion
 Paul Clauss – international rugby player
 Alistair Darling – former Labour Chancellor of the Exchequer
 Air Marshal Sir Patrick Dunn – Royal Air Force officer who served as Air Officer Commanding-in-Chief of Flying Training Command
 Fergus Ewing – SNP politician
 Sir Nicholas Fairbairn – Conservative politician, former Solicitor General for Scotland
 Sir Denis Forman – Chair of the British Film Institute; Chairman and Managing Director of Granada Television
 Peter Fraser, Baron Fraser of Carmyllie – Conservative politician, former Solicitor General for Scotland
 Keith Geddes – Scottish Rugby Union player who fought in the Battle of Britain
 Stephen Gilbert (1912–2010) – Northern Irish novelist
 Major George Howson – Founder of the Royal British Legion Poppy Factory
 Alan Johnston, Lord Johnston – Senator of the College of Justice
 William Alexander Kerr – Victoria Cross recipient
 William Laidlay – Scottish artist, barrister and cricketer
 Hector Laing, Baron Laing of Dunphail – businessman and peer
 Norman Lamont – former Conservative Chancellor of the Exchequer
 Hew Lorimer – sculptor
 Donald Mackenzie Scottish judge, styled Lord Mackenzie
 Andrew Marr – journalist
 Edward Powys Mathers – translator, poet, and pioneer cryptic crossword setter
 James Broom Millar – first Director General of the Ghana Broadcasting Corporation (1954–1960)
 James, Duke of Montrose – nobleman
 Robin Orr – composer
 Jamie Parker – actor and singer
 Sir Robert Pearson – cricketer, advocate and chairman of the London Stock Exchange
 Hugo Rifkind – columnist
 M.G. (Calum) Semple OBE - Epidemiologist 
 Rev. Henry Holmes Stewart (1847–1937) FA Cup winner in 1873
 Rob Strachan – Commander of Clan Strachan
 David Strang – Former Chief Constable of Lothian and Borders, and Chief Inspector of Scottish Prisons
 Alan Sutherland – artist

Motto
The motto of the school, Spartam nactus es, hanc exorna, means literally "You have obtained Sparta: embellish it". The Latin is a mistranslation by Erasmus of a line from a Greek play, Telephus by Euripides. The words have been interpreted as meaning "You were born with talents: develop them" or "Develop whatever talents you have inherited".

In the late 18th century, the words were quoted by Edmund Burke in his pamphlet, Reflections on the Revolution in France:

References

Sources

External links
Loretto School's official website
Profile on the ISC website

Gallery

Secondary schools in East Lothian
Primary schools in East Lothian
Boarding schools in East Lothian
Member schools of the Headmasters' and Headmistresses' Conference
Educational institutions established in 1827
Musselburgh
1827 establishments in Scotland
Private schools in East Lothian